= Interak =

- Type: Personal computer
- Released: 1982; 44 years ago
- Operating system: CP/M
- CPU: Z80 @ 4 MHz;

Interak is a range of Z80 based CP/M computers from Greenbank Electronics a small UK producer of Z80-based computers in the early 1980s based in Liverpool.

The system was a rack back system that allowed the purchase of individual boards to expand the system. The bus is of Interak's own design.
